The 1965 Individual Long Track European Championship was the ninth edition of the Long Track European Championship. The final was held on 12 September 1965 in Seinäjoki, Finland.

The title was won by Björn Knutsson of Sweden.

Venues
Qualifying Round 1 - Skive, 18 May, 1965
Qualifying Round 2 - Scheeßel, 30 May, 1965
Qualifying Round 3 - Mühldorf am Inn, 18 July, 1965
Final -  Seinäjoki, 12 September 1965

Final Classification

References 

Motor
Motor
International sports competitions hosted by Finland